

Karachukar Valley
or Chalachigu Valley is a valley in Taxkorgan Tajik Autonomous County, Xinjiang, China.
It contains the basin of the Karachukar River, a tributary of the Tashkurgan River,
and is regarded as part of Taghdumbash Pamir.
The valley borders Afghanistan (Wakhan Corridor or Little Pamir) to the west and northwest, Tajikistan to the north, and Pakistan (Gojal or upper Hunza) to the south. The name of the valley is from Kyrgyz, meaning "black cave".

The valley is part of the Taxkorgan Nature Reserve. The protected Marco Polo sheep is only found around this area.  The region is often referred to by the Chinese as the Chinese portion of the Wakhan Corridor. There is an ethnic Kyrgyz village called Bayik ( or ).

The entire Chalachigu Valley is closed to visitors. However, local residents and herders from the area are permitted access.

In March 2017, CCTV-7's Documentary for Military program produced a mini-series covering the numerous border outposts in Chalachigu Valley.

Mountain Passes

The valley was a significant thoroughfare of the Silk Road during ancient times. Around the valley are numerous passes connecting to other countries:

 Tajikistan - Beyik Pass
 Afghanistan - Wakhjir Pass, Tegermansu Pass
 Pakistan - Kilik Pass, Mintaka Pass

Of the above passes, it is believed that the famous Chinese Buddhist pilgrim Xuanzang traveled through Wakhjir Pass on his return trip back to China around 649 AD. Some Chinese historians argue that he also used Beyik Pass on his way to India.

See also
Afghanistan–China border
China–Pakistan border
China–Tajikistan border
Dafdar

Notes

References

 Sources

External links
 Kalachukur river basin, OpenStreetMap, retrieved 27 May 2022.

Valleys of Xinjiang
Tashkurgan Tajik Autonomous County